General elections were held in Denmark on 20 November 2001. For the first time since the 1924 elections, the Social Democrats did not win the most seats. Anders Fogh Rasmussen of the centre-right Venstre became Prime Minister in coalition with the Conservative People's Party, as the head of the first Rasmussen government, with the support from Danish People's Party.

The coalition relied on the votes of other right-wing parties such as the Danish People's Party, which polled better than ever before. Voter turnout was 87.1% in Denmark proper, 80.0% in the Faroe Islands and 61.5% in Greenland. The Venstre led coalition government would last until the 2011 election, lasting through two intermediate elections.

The election marked a major shift in Danish politics: It was the first time that the right leaning parties held an outright majority in the parliament since the beginning of the modern democratic system in Denmark in 1901; although right leaning parties had held power several times, they had always had to share power with more centrist or left-wing parties in coalition governments, such as the Danish Social Liberal Party. Historian Bo Lidegaard said that the vote showed a move away from broad national consensus which had existed since the 1930s regarding the style of governance in Denmark. One of the most important changes that forced the change was the rise of immigration as a political issue and the ensuing rise of the Danish People's Party. Immigration played a central role in the 2001 campaign and was thrust into focus by the 11 September 2001 terrorist attacks in the United States, although it had been gaining attention for years.

Results

See also
List of members of the Folketing, 2001–2005

References

Elections in Denmark
Denmark
2001 elections in Denmark
November 2001 events in Europe